Yiannis Spyropoulos (March 12, 1912 – May 18, 1990) was a famous Greek painter of the second half of the 20th century.

Life and work

Spyropoulos was born in Pylos of Messenia. In 1933 he was accepted at the Athens School of Fine Arts.
His teachers included Spyridon Vikatos, Oumbertos Argyros and Epameinondas Thomopoulos.
Eight years later the Academy of Athens rewards Spyropoulos with the first prize and the opportunity to study in the École nationale supérieure des Beaux-Arts in Paris. During his studies he was taught by Charles-François-Prosper Guérin.

See also
Art in modern Greece
Contemporary Greek art

References

External links

Spyropoulos Foundation
Spyropoulos paintings
Municipal Art Gallery Of Chania
Painter's folder in the Teloglion Foundation of Art

1912 births
1990 deaths
20th-century Greek painters
Herder Prize recipients
People from Messenia